Roger de Montgomery (died 7 February 1055), was seigneur of Montgomery, vicomte of the Hiémois, and a member of the House of Montgomerie.

Life
No near-contemporary source gives Roger's parentage.  The younger Roger de Montgomery, actually son of this Roger, was instead said by chronicler Robert of Torigni to have been born to a Hugh de Montgomery by Josseline, niece of Gunnor, Duchess of Normandy.  One possible interpretation of this clear misstatement is that a generation has been dropped, and that it was the elder Roger who was son of Hugh and Josseline, though others conclude that Josseline's husband was the elder Roger, the assignment of the name Hugh to her husband being the error.  Though Robert de Torigni calls Josceline daughter of Wevia, sister of Gunnor, a letter from the reign of Henry I states she was daughter of another sister, Senfria.

Roger held the lands of Saint-Germain-de-Montgommery and Sainte-Foy-de-Montgommery, both of which show traces of early castles. He acquired the office of vicomte of the Hiémois probably about the time Robert I became Duke in 1027. In  he witnessed a charter to the abbey of St. Wandrille by Robert I, Duke of Normandy as vicomte. Like Duke Robert, Roger began acquiring church properties, among these, half the town of Bernay. He took over a wood at 'Crispus Fagidus' which belonged to Jumièges Abbey in the 1030s. He suppressed a market held by the same abbey and transferred it into his own domain. He later returned the market to the abbey and paid restitution for their losses.

In 1035 at Robert I's death, his great uncle, Robert Archbishop of Rouen ruled Normandy as regent. Roger seems to have lost favor with the young duke as well as his vicomte office as he signed an early charter of Duke William simply as Roger of Montgomery. At the archbishop’s death in 1037, anarchy broke out in Normandy and among the rebels was Roger de Montgomery, formerly one of Duke Robert's closest companions, who, after being defeated in his own territory, fled to the court of Henry I of France. Roger had been forced into exile by Osbern the Steward who was afterwards killed by William de Montgomery, Roger's son. Roger died on February 7, 1055, in exile in Paris.  In 1068 his wife was still holding lands at Bures and Saint-Pair.

Family
Interpolating William of Jumièges provides the names of their five sons:
 Hugh de Montgomery
 Robert de Montgomery
 Roger II de Montgomery, 1st Earl of Shrewsbury
 William de Montgomery killed during the minority of duke William
 Gilbert de Montgomery who in 1063 was claimed by Orderic to have been poisoned by Mabel de Bellême

Notes

References

Medieval French nobility
11th-century Normans
Viscounts of France
11th-century French people
Clan Montgomery